Mathéo Parmentier (born 31 October 2002) is a Belgian professional footballer who plays as a defender for Gent.

Career
Parmentier started his professional career at Lokeren. After the club was declared bankrupt on 20 April 2020, he moved to Gent as a free agent, signing a three-year contract.

Career statistics

Club

References

2002 births
Living people
Belgian footballers
Association football defenders
Belgian Pro League players
Challenger Pro League players
F.C.V. Dender E.H. players
K.S.C. Lokeren Oost-Vlaanderen players
K.A.A. Gent players